Adeeba Malik  (born 30 September 1966) is a British-Pakistani teacher, executive, and trustee.

Biography
Malik's father, Mohammed Sadiq Malik, had moved to Bradford from Pakistan in 1958. In 1965 he had returned to Sialkot where he met Fahmeeda. The two were married and, in 1966 moved to Bradford. In a 2022 interview to celebrate International Women's Day, Adeeba noted that in 1967 her mother, Fahmeeda, was one of only 67 south-asian women in her community in Bradford numbering over 3,000. Adeeba attended The Grange school in Bradford and studied for a Bachelor's Degree and then a Master's Degree in education at the University of Hull.

In 1992 Malik joined the QED Foundation, a Bradford-based charity which works to eradicate poverty, disadvantage and discrimination amongst disadvantaged communities. She is currently its Deputy Chief Executive. She has worked with many different social projects, including the Waterways Trust, The National Muslim Women's Advisory Board, and is a former governor of Sheffield Hallam University. Through her position with Bradford Culture Company Ltd she has supported Bradford’s bid to host the UK City of Culture title in 2025. She is Member of the Honours Committee in the Community and Voluntary Services committee. On 1 November 2021 she was appointed as a trustee of York Museums Trust. She is also a trustee of Carers Resource, and Poverty Alleviation Scholarships.

Malik was appointed an MBE in the 2004 Birthday Honours for services to community relations and to business in Bradford, and in the 2015 New Year Honours she was appointed a CBE for services to interfaith and community cohesion.

References

1966 births
Trustees of York Museums Trust
Commanders of the Order of the British Empire
Members of the Order of the British Empire
People from Bradford
Alumni of the University of Hull
Living people